From 2006 to 2017, Australian comedy duo Hamish & Andy hosted a number of radio shows. Their first programme, Hamish & Andy, began on Fox FM in 2006 and was broadcast nationwide on the Hit Network from 2007 to 2010 in the weekday drive time slot. The show was the highest-rated radio series in Australian history, consistently gaining up to 20% market share in the crucial Melbourne market, with around 2.7 million listeners and 1 million podcast downloads each week.

From 2011 to 2012, the show was restructured to broadcast weekly on Fridays. In 2013, a new programme, Business Brunch, was broadcast every morning from Tuesday to Friday, until July 2013 when the show was moved to weekday afternoons in their Happy Hour show. In 2015, the show returned to its original drive-home time slot on weekdays.

The duo retired from radio broadcasting at the end of 2017, choosing to instead focus on podcasting in a weekly show titled Hamish & Andy, releasing every Thursday since 2018. The podcast has remained Australia's most downloaded comedy podcast for four years in a row. Since 2020, the duo has also released Hamish & Andy's Remembering Project, a short-form weekly podcast focusing on revisiting segments from their past years of broadcasting.

Team
The Hamish & Andy radio team primarily consisted of:

 Hamish Blake – host
 Andy Lee – host
 Jack Post – co-host
 Horgs (Michael Horgan) – inventor
 Web Geezer Jez (Jeremy Carne) – web producer
 Radio Mike (Mike Liberale) – producer, co-host

Guest hosts
The show had been hosted by a special guest filling in for either Hamish or Andy on several occasions. Stephen Curry and Ryan Shelton filled in for Blake when he was sick with pneumonia, and on 16 March 2010, Lee's now ex-girlfriend Megan Gale filled in for him while he had an operation to replace his two front teeth, which were lost during an attempt to play ice hockey during "training" for the bi-bi-tri-bi-athlon (24 sports in one weekend).

Show summary

Hamish & Andy drive show (2006–2013)

The Hamish & Andy drive show's opening theme was a combination of The A-Team opening titles, and "Turn It Up" by hip hop group Ugly Duckling (the latter also signifying the end of the show).

Their original radio show began on Fox FM in 2006, and by 2007 it was broadcast on the Hit Network to every state in Australia, as well as the ACT, for two hours in the key weekday afternoon drive time slot until the end of 2010. It since took on a variety of timeslots and formats. It was also broadcast in New Zealand and Dubai as a weekly highlights package.

In late 2009, a 3-hour special entitled "Hamish and Andy's Midwinter Warmer" was broadcast in the United Kingdom on BBC6 Music.

Notable activities

 The People's Chip – In 2008, Hamish and Andy were dared by an audience member to invent a new favour of potato crisp. They eventually invented gravy flavour. The chip was launched on 27 June 2008 in an event with hundreds of viewers which included a performance from Melissa Tkautz. Other notable individuals at the launch were Brian McFadden and the Smith chip company's advertising character "Gobbledok".
 The People's Greyhound – In September 2006, Hamish and Andy purchased a greyhound and named it Fred Basset, after the comic strip character of the same name. This was purchased using proceeds from Blake betting $800, which was originally put aside for a holiday with his girlfriend, on Lee being named Cleo's Bachelor of the Year. 50% of Basset's winnings went to the Greyhound Adoption Program.
 Conjoined Twins – In 2007 after accidentally offending a radio listener while talking about conjoined twins Hamish and Andy were sewn into a suit together for a week. They were detached on Rove on the Sunday.
 Afghanistan – In April 2008, the duo travelled to Afghanistan and performed their show live (except for the Friday show) alongside Australian soldiers. The trip to Afghanistan was first instigated when the duo received an email from an Australian soldier serving overseas, excited about hearing The Hamish & Andy Show at his base. The letter opened discussion of whether the show should go overseas and broadcast with the troops. Hamish and Andy, after contacting the Australian Defence Force several times, were told they would be able to broadcast in an overseas location where the troops were serving.
 The Tall Ship Adventure; Open Your Buccaneers Tasmania – In 2009, to commemorate the show beginning broadcasting to Tasmania, Hamish and Andy sailed in a 200-year-old tall ship known as "Taully Shore" across the Bass Strait from mainland Australia to Tasmania. During this period they broadcast, despite the stormy conditions.
 Annual Logies Spit Roast Party – On several years from 2007, Hamish and Andy hosted a spit-roast party on the last Friday afternoon before the annual TV Week Logie Awards. A tradition is for a foodfight between Hamish and Andy and TV personality Jules Lund. This tradition in 2013 culminated with Hamish and Andy launching a "preemptive strike".
 Freeating – Hamish & Andy decided to only eat free food for a week in July 2009 for Rove.
 The People's Bull – In 2010 Hamish and Andy entered Stock & Land's competition to win a Moyle Pathfinder Angus Bull worth $6000 so they could become "bull-ionaires". They enlisted listeners to collect the 4 weekly coupons to enter, but they didn't win, but got in contact with the winners and successfully asked for them to call it Sandra Bullock.
 Ghosting – Ghosting was a "sport" they created which involved one person walking as close as possible behind another for as long as possible without them being aware of it. This was first featured on Rove but was later featured on the Tonight Show with Jay Leno in the US and in the UK the Graham Norton Show. In America the Twin Cities Ghosting League in Minnesota practices the sport.
 Thank You Tour – In 2010 to thank their listeners for participating in the daily radio show for the past 5 years, Hamish and Andy travelled around Australia broadcasting a free live show each day from 29 November to 3 December in 5 major cities, Perth (Paterson's Stadium), Adelaide (Coopers Stadium), Brisbane (Botanical Gardens), Sydney (Fox Studios) and Melbourne (Myer Music Bowl). In their first show, they performed with Perth bands Birds of Tokyo, Eskimo Joe and Shaun Micallef and Stephen Curry also attended. 3700 fans came out to watch in 37 °C heat.
 Steven Seagal Energy Drink – In 2011 Blake attempted to find celebrity Steven Seagal after in May 2009 he ordered two slabs of his 'Lightning Bolt' energy drink, which had been paid for but never arrived. They attempted to find it through identification of a bikini-clad girl in an ad for the drink, who they successfully identified as a woman named Cherie Ditcham, and in the end received 10 drinks. After Blake tasted one, Blake and Lee wanted to distribute them to the listeners, but due to their boss Dave Cameron expressing legal concerns due to the drinks being out of date, the drinks were poured into the ocean.
 BYO Pool Party – Celebrated the final show of the year with live performances by Powderfinger and John Butler Trio at Hickson Road Resort. Listeners of the show brought paddling pools which were filled up at the venue.
 Caravan of Courage
 Caravan of Courage – In October 2007, Hamish and Andy set out on their Caravan of Courage trip in an attempt to "hug" Australia, with the intention of travelling from Perth to Brisbane and visiting many small towns that do not typically receive tourist recognition along the way. They broadcast their radio show from wherever they were at 4 pm AEST each day. Locations they broadcast from included Southern Cross, Norseman and Cocklebiddy from Western Australia, Taliem Bend from South Australia, Donald and Benalla from Victoria, and Goulburn and Bulahdelah from New South Wales.
 Caravan of Courage 2: Who Dares Dar-Wins – In October 2008, Hamish and Andy were challenged by an e-mailer to 'hug' Australia again. After first hesitating on travelling Australia again, the duo decided, after much argument with their boss, Fox FM's Program Director Dave Cameron that they would set out on 27 October for the 'Caravan of Courage II: Who Dares Dar-Wins' trip starting from Melbourne and heading up to Darwin. As they had previously travelled across Australia, they wanted to head "up the guts" of Australia. Locations they broadcast from included Nhill in Victoria, Roxby Downs and Coober Pedy from South Australia, Yalara (Uluru), Aileron, Darwin and Mataranka from the Northern Territory.
 Caravan of Courage 3: Yes We Van – Hamish and Andy announced in early August 2009 that they wanted to go on a two-week caravan trip in America, driving from Miami to Los Angeles. They travelled in campervan, dubbing it "Yes We Van" as a pun on the iconic quote by former US President Barack Obama, "yes we can", dubbing the vehicle "Abravan Lincoln" (after Abraham Lincoln). Before going Hamish and Andy received written approval from former Prime Minister Kevin Rudd. Locations they broadcast from included Dade City in Florida, Andalusia in Alabama, Laurel in Mississippi, Magdalena in New Mexico and Show Low in Arizona.
 Caravan of Courage 4: Great Britain and Ireland – In May 2010, Hamish and Andy announced they were doing a fourth Caravan of Courage to Great Britain and Ireland. During the trip they had a dedicated digital station – "Caravan of Courage Radio" which aired their show from 31 May through to 11 June. On this trip they named their van Sir Vancelot after Sir Lancelot, a character in the Arthurian legend. Locations they broadcast from included Doolin and Roscrea in Ireland, Strauchur and Loch Ness in Scotland, and Ravenglass, Tarporly and Warwick in England.

Regular segments 
 Blast from the Past – In this segment, the boys call up a random number and have to try to convince the person on the line that they knew each other from the past, sometimes also asking them for a ridiculous favour.
 Trading Post Game – Each week, Hamish and Andy take turns competing to guess the item that the other has picked out of the Trading Post, by calling up the seller and asking them 5 questions.
 Fred Basset – At the end of the show on each Friday, Blake, much to the disdain of Lee, read the Fred Basset comic on air.
 Trivial Claims Court – A listener calls in with a trivial question with the show trying to answer it. One example is 'what is the cut-off height for a midget?'
 Experimental as Anything – This was a segment where Hamish and Andy did odd experiments. A notable example was when seeing if Lee could sneeze with his eyes open. In this incident Blake blew a straw full of black pepper up Lee's nose, which resulted in Lee being subject to extreme pain. The pain was attempted to be treated using water and saline solution.
 HB:BC – Stands for Hamish Blake's Big Call. Big calls have included to un-follow Barack Obama on Twitter and to claim he can "Ride the Foamy Dragon" – i.e., drink the foam coming out of a Coca-Cola bottle with Mentos, which he attempted and failed.
 Random John – Random John was a segment that involved Hamish & Andy calling a phone number at random, and hoping for a John. If they were to get a John, they would earn one John Point; in the event that the recipient was named John Johnson, it would be worth fifty John Points, and in the event that the call was picked up by a John Johnny Johnson, they would earn one hundred and twenty John Points. If, on the other hand, the call recipient was named Rob, they would lose a John Point, as an email from a podcaster that stated they would never get a John led them to believe that Robs were the nemeses of Johns. After it emerged that the Manchester-based Key 103 radio station had picked up the segment and were separately playing for John Points, Hamish & Andy declared the start of a Random John World Cup; since this, a number of additional radio shows also started playing Random John. Hamish & Andy eventually scored their first John Point on 27 May 2011. Upon becoming the leaders in the Random John world cup on a John Streak of one, the duo decided to stop playing the game indefinitely, as the risk of calling a Rob and losing their John Point was too high. The segment may restart if another Random John World Cup participant gets a John point.
 Horgs' Inventions – Occasionally, Andy's friend Horgs is asked to talk about his latest ideas for inventions. Horgs also interviewed Tom Cruise with Andy while Hamish was at a wedding. Horgs is Andy's ex-roommate and high school best friend. His day job is selling children's books. His wife's name is Katie and he is famous on the show for beginning his segment with a whistle, a sound the guys joke is a 'signal for investors to get out their chequebooks' to invest in his idea. Listeners are then invited to call into the show if they had any questions, suggestions, or comments for Horgs about the idea. Very often, listeners may suggest improvements to the ideas, or even point out that similar inventions were already being sold on the market. Some of Horgs' inventions include:
 'Weatherbet', which was a website on which one could bet on the weather for the next day, an idea which the following week Horgs' explained was stolen by a listener who subsequently registered the domain name, which also began Horgs' catchphrase of "invest with me; not against me".
 The 'Horgiana', a 'comfortable shoe'; the name of which was a direct play on the brand Havaianas.
 The 'TLC' or 'Two-Level Car', an idea which he presented to Richard Branson at the opening of his Virgin Active gym in Sydney, which was, surprisingly, not totally dismissed by Richard.
 The '13 (one-three) Decide', which is a text-message service, whereby customers can send in a text message when they have trouble making a decision on any aspect of life no matter how trivial (e.g. what to eat for lunch), and Horgs will make the decision for them.

Business Brunch (2013)

Hamish and Andy returned to daily radio in early 2013 with a new show, originally called "Business Brunch", airing from 9am to 10am Tuesdays to Fridays (except in Sydney, where it would air from 10am to 11am, following The Kyle & Jackie O Show). This complemented their regular drive time show which had moved to Mondays.

Rather than having recurring segments each day, it aimed to cover one topic per show. Listeners were invited to contribute their expertise on a wide range of topics via their website, rather than through the traditional radio phone-in method. This allowed the show to be pre-recorded when necessary to facilitate filming for Gap Year. During each episode, Hamish and Andy read out and respond to listeners' contributions, who were addressed on air as "Company Man" or "Company Lady". Occasionally, the pair called listeners with interesting or humorous contributions to share more.

The late Nine Network news personality Peter Harvey provided the voice of the introduction, even after his death (as it was the wish of him and his family).

Notable activities

 Business Brunch Mugs – As a reward for listeners who made exceptional contributions to the show, Hamish & Andy ordered a shipment of 50 coffee mugs with the Business Brunch logo on them. The "Mug God" (a character voiced by Hamish) had the final say on who received a coveted mug. A series of "Mug Commandments" were developed by the Mug God, mostly to prevent people who expressly asked for a mug from being eligible to receive one. Some listeners attempted to trap Hamish & Andy into giving them a mug, while many were given away as a reward for games developed by Hamish & Andy. In the final episode of the Business Brunch on 21 June 2013, "The Promotion", the remaining mugs were donated to the National Film and Sound Archive in Canberra as part of radio history.

Happy Hour (2013–2014)

The pair announced on 21 June 2013 show that they had been "promoted" to the early drive slot of 3pm to 4pm weekdays. The show was renamed 'Happy Hour' and continued the aim of discussing one topic per show. The move to this slot signaled a hiatus from their weekly 4–6pm drive show. They briefly returned to the drive slot for two weeks in July 2014 to fill in for current drive hosts Dan & Maz during radio survey break.

Notable activities

 Gold-Coloured Watches – The Happy Hour Gold-Coloured Watch replaced the Business Brunch Mug as the reward for outstanding contributions to the show. One hundred watches were ordered. As well as being issued as rewards for challenges (or blackmail), there were 19 secret ways in which to earn a watch. These included licensing an animated character of one's own design to the Happy Hour, or being Hamish's newborn son. Receiving a watch was considered rare, but in the extremely unlikely situation that a single listener received three Gold-Coloured Watches, they would receive a Happy Hour Sombrero, the official hat of the Happy Hour. As of May 2014, a total of 20 watches and zero sombreros had been issued. 
 Gold Watch Scandal – In the 2 June 2014 edition of the Happy Hour, it was revealed that a gold-coloured watch had been placed on auction website eBay by its recipient, a listener named James. Hamish & Andy were displeased with this, as it is impossible to assign a value to such a priceless object. In order to prevent an existing watch owner from purchasing an additional watch and getting closer to the coveted Happy Hour sombrero, Hamish & Andy offered to pay James $300 cash to buy back the watch. The watch was deemed cursed and blown up (in a wheelbarrow full of watermelons) using explosives. An attempt to record this event in super-slow motion (thus justifying the watermelons) was bungled. In spite of this, a largely intact watch was recovered by a listener of the show sometime later, at the site of the explosion. Hamish & Andy then speculated that the curse could be broken by cutting the watch into several pieces and separating them forever (in a possible allusion to the Horcruxes from the Harry Potter series). These pieces were then shipped to listeners deemed 'remote' enough, to prevent the watch, and hence curse, from ever being reassembled.
 Tyreright Book of Records – In late 2013, Hamish & Andy launched their own book of world records to rival the Guinness Book of World Records. The difference with the new book was that there was no verification of the record, one merely needed to be the first to post it on the Hamish & Andy website. Dubbed the "XXXX Book of Records", Hamish & Andy were open to any sponsor (alcoholic or otherwise) to purchase naming rights to the book. A Tyreright franchisee from Brisbane paid $1,200 (to cover the cost of a dinghy to access the People's Island) in early 2014, and thus the book was renamed to reflect its new sponsor.
 Timomatic Autograph Business – In 2014, Hamish started selling Timomatic's autograph on the show's website and promoting the business on the Hamish & Andy show. Hamish maintained that the autograph on sale had not been personally scribed by Timomatic, but was indeed Timomatic's autograph (the shape and style being the same). A single autograph started at a sale price of $10, but the price went through various 'sale' and 'special promotion' stages. Hamish deemed that though his business amounted to forgery, he was above being 'blown wide open', as it was a 'homage' to Timomatic. Before the Happy Hour ended in 2014, Hamish and Andy had Timomatic as a guest on the show. After testing that Timomatic could sufficiently reproduce the reproduction of his own autograph (albeit not as well), Hamish passed the business on to Timomatic, enabling him to legally sell his own autograph.
 Radio Survivor – On 25 July 2013, the topic of the day was Survivor, which, among other topics, covered the popular reality game show of the same name. Hamish and Andy chose to play a game of Survivor over the course of a 15-minute radio segment with callers of their show. The "Challenge" were simply arbitrary question (such as "What is your name?" and "what is your job?"). After the challenge, the contestants could strategise for the upcoming Tribal Council vote with the other but only for 10 seconds. At tribal council, each contestant would vote, with the others on hold to ensure the votes are private.  The 5 contestants for this game Josh, Laura, Steph, Nick, and Mathew. The game resulted in Nick being voted by the jury to be the winner over Mathew. Later in November, Josh (who was voted out due to a "vote-count error") returned to Radio Survivor for Radio Survivor All-Stars with a selection of Australian celebrities, where he won.

Regular segments

 Hamish Blows It Wide Open – Hamish finds a cover-up or a lie sent in by a listener and exposes it, and thus "blows it wide open".
 Friends Galore – Jack Post gives Hamish and Andy the names of two similar-sounding people, organisations, brands, television shows or other things, and they have to decide who has a greater number of friends on Facebook. If they do not guess at least two out of the three pairs correctly, they must send a Happy Hour Coaster to the show's nemesis, Tony Barber (who stood them up for a song-writing session in late 2013). Having realised that if they lose six times, Barber will have a full set of 6 coasters, Hamish & Andy decided the game would probably be retired after their 5th loss. On 11 August 2014, the Friends Galore iPhone app was released into the Apple App Store by a fan.
 Jazz Up Your Anecdote – A listener tells a story from their life that has a great start but a mundane ending. Other listeners then offer false but more exciting conclusions to the original anecdote. The owner of the story then chooses their favourite new ending and agrees to change the story to include the new ending and tell it as fact from now on.

Return to drive show (2015–2017)
The pair announced on 29 October 2014 that the show would return to the national drive slot (4–7pm) on the Hit Network. They also publish a podcast that is a condensed version of their daily show, excluding ads and songs. On 2 December 2016 the pair announced 2017 will be their final year on air.

Since the pair's comeback, the duo had slowing ratings mainly due to the Hit Network's poor breakfast shows in the Sydney and Brisbane markets. With their main rivals being a Sydney-based show that was formed from Brisbane breakfast, Hamish and Andy needed strong breakfast offerings from the Hit Network to reclaim listeners as they resumed the drive slot. The pair, however, have always held good ratings in the Melbourne market, usually winning ratings and holding a lead over their predominately Sydney-based rivals.

Notable activities

 Race That Slows Down The Nation – In 2015, Hamish & Andy ran a horse suit race in the country town of Wedderburn, Victoria, on the Monday before the Melbourne Cup. The race was originally designed to include horses, but as more and more people started to write to the show asking if they could enter the race in a horse outfit, Hamish & Andy later changed the rules to be a horse suit only race.
 Eating The Board – In 2017, Hamish and Andy attempt to eat all of the items on the McDonald's menu.. After much discussion, the finalised menu involved 22 items – notably the Chicken & Cheese and the McFeast, at Hamish's insistence. 58 minutes into the challenge, while attempting to 'rampage' the rest of his Quarter Pounder, Andy threw up and the challenge was over.
 Crowd Surfing Show – On Thursday 4 May 2017, Hamish and Andy did their entire two-hour show while crowd surfing on an inflatable raft. Other notable events from this show include Hamish surfing the crowd on his electronic drum kit similar to Josh Dun, the drummer from Twenty One Pilots; and the boys breaking the world record for the fastest 50 m crowd surf, with Hamish dressed as Jasmine and Andy dressed as Aladdin on a magic carpet.
 Operation: Dry Tank – The duo wondered how far it was possible to drive once a car's fuel light claimed to have 0 kilometres left. "The race that stops the car" took place on 7 November 2017, with the results of the experiment airing the next day. After initially thinking they would only be able to drive for 14 kilometres, they managed to drive for nearly 2 hours and 111.9 kilometres.

Regular segments

 Red Jumper, Green Coat – Hamish and Andy compete against each other to call up public venues (such as a pool or a library) to find either a red jumper (Hamish) or a green coat (Andy) in their Lost and Found.
 Tell Us Someone We Haven't Thought Of In A While – A listener calls in and says a famous person or character's name that Hamish & Andy have not thought of in a while (generally accepted to be in the last 6 months). If neither Hamish nor Andy has thought of the person or character in the previous six months or so, the listener wins a hat that has been sent in by various companies around Australia. If the person is not known by either Hamish or Andy, the caller is disqualified.
 The Duping Game – A listener calls in and talks briefly about a special item that they are in possession of, Hamish & Andy ask them questions about the item to try to guess if the caller really has the item or is attempting to dupe them.
 Upset Andy – First aired on Tuesday 5 April 2016, Hamish started a weekly Tuesday segment where listeners call up and explain things that may upset Lee. Many things have upset Andy on the show, including placing forks upside down in cutlery compartment, random placement of dishes in dishwasher, header duct not parallel to wall, Tupperware with lids that don't match, not carrying one's passport in a passport holder, and tearing a bag straight open that is designed to be resealable.
 Song To Cram – A listener chooses a topic of which they have extensive knowledge and Hamish and Andy are given however long the next song goes for to learn everything they can about that topic. Once the song is over, the listener asks three questions relating to their specialty topic. Some topics have included John F. Kennedy, African Elephants, Ned Kelly, the Constitution of Australia and the Airbus A380.
 Hamish & Andy's International Phrase Book – This segment is done upon Hamish & Andy, choosing a category for the day and then callers call in with similar sayings from different countries with their literal translation. Categories have included 'stupid people', 'the grass is always greener', 'packed to the rafters', 'unattractive person', 'pigs might fly' and 'upset person'.

Compilations
Hamish and Andy have released two ARIA Award-winning double-disc compilation albums, featuring highlights from The Hamish & Andy Show.

Awards and nominations

Australian Commercial Radio Awards

See also
List of Australian podcasts

References

External links
 
 Hamish & Andy podcasts
 Brad Blanks, Hamish & Andy contributor interview

Hamish & Andy
Radio sketch shows